Abshar Rural District is a rural district (dehestan) in the Central District of Shadegan County, Khuzestan Province, Iran. At the 2006 census, its population was 10,832, in 1,991 families.  The rural district has 17 villages.

References 

Rural Districts of Khuzestan Province
Shadegan County